Saša Branežac (born 23 December 1976) is a Serbian former professional footballer who played as a striker. He also holds Croatian citizenship.

During his journeyman career, Branežac played professionally in Serbia and Montenegro, Hungary, Bosnia and Herzegovina, Malaysia, Greece, Indonesia, and the United Arab Emirates.

Club career
Branežac was born in Osijek, SR Croatia, back then part of Yugoslavia, and started playing at youth team of local NK Osijek. He and his family decided to move to Serbia and he started playing for Sartid Smederevo, before transferring to FR Yugoslavia champions Obilić in the 1998–99 winter transfer window. He was later loaned to newly promoted First League club Sutjeska Nikšić for the 1999–2000 season, scoring 12 goals in 37 appearances.

In early 2004, Branežac moved to Asia and joined Malaysia Premier League side MPPJ Selangor. He helped them win first place in Group B and then beat the winners of Group A, Melaka Telekom, 3–2 in the season's final, as the club earned promotion to the Malaysia Super League.

Statistics

Honours
MPPJ Selangor
 Malaysia Premier League: 2004

References

External links
 
 

1976 births
Living people
Footballers from Osijek
Serbs of Croatia
Association football forwards
Croatian footballers
Serbia and Montenegro footballers
Serbian footballers
FK Smederevo players
FK Obilić players
FK Sutjeska Nikšić players
FK Napredak Kruševac players
MTK Budapest FC players
FK Glasinac Sokolac players
MPPJ FC players
FK Čukarički players
Aiolikos F.C. players
Penang F.C. players
Deltras F.C. players
UPB-MyTeam FC players
Al Hamriyah Club players
FK Kovačevac players
First League of Serbia and Montenegro players
Nemzeti Bajnokság I players
Premier League of Bosnia and Herzegovina players
Malaysia Premier League players
Malaysia Super League players
Gamma Ethniki players
Liga 1 (Indonesia) players
UAE First Division League players
Serbian expatriate footballers
Serbia and Montenegro expatriate footballers
Expatriate footballers in Hungary
Serbia and Montenegro expatriate sportspeople in Hungary
Expatriate footballers in Bosnia and Herzegovina
Serbia and Montenegro expatriate sportspeople in Bosnia and Herzegovina
Expatriate footballers in Malaysia
Serbian expatriate sportspeople in Malaysia
Expatriate footballers in Greece
Serbia and Montenegro expatriate sportspeople in Greece
Expatriate footballers in Indonesia
Serbian expatriate sportspeople in Indonesia
Expatriate footballers in the United Arab Emirates
Serbian expatriate sportspeople in the United Arab Emirates